The men's long jump event at the 2009 Summer Universiade was held on 11–12 July.

Medalists

Results

Qualification
Qualification: 7.85 m (Q) or at least 12 best (q) qualified for the final.

Final

References
Results (archived)

Long
2009